Abubhai Adamji Jasdenwala (1899-06-24 in Bombay – 1982-09-15 in Bombay) was a businessman and cricket administrator.

Jasdenwala was educated at the Bharda New High School and St. Xavier's College in Bombay. He was part of the committee that mooted the idea of the BCCI. He was the Vice President (1954–55), President  (1957–58 - 1958–59) and Hon. Treasurer (1935-36 - 1936–37) of the Bombay Cricket Association.

Jasdenwala served as the honorary secretary of the Cricket Club of India (CCI) from 1937 to 1945 and turned around the finances of the struggling club. He was also the President of the CCI from 1950 to 1951 and again from 1964 to 1971 and the President of the Billiards Association in 1955.

Jasdenwala's death was due to a heart attack.

References
 Obituary in Indian Cricket 1983
 Vasant Raiji and Anandji Dossa, CCI & the Brabourne Stadium, Cricket Club of India, 1987

1899 births
1982 deaths
Indian cricket administrators